Semarang Residency was an administrative subdivision (Residency) of the Dutch East Indies located on the northern coast of Central Java and named after its capital city Semarang. It existed from 1818 to 1942, although its borders were changed many times during that period.

History

Prehistory

The territory around Semarang was the core of the Demak Sultanate in the sixteenth century; after its decline the Mataram Sultanate came to claim it. As the Dutch East India Company (VOC) became a greater presence in Java in the seventeenth century, they allied themselves with Mataram in exchange for trade and territorial concessions. Although Mataram continued to control most of central and eastern Java, they ceded the city of Semarang and its surrounding villages to the VOC in January 1678. At first it was only a small enclave, but gradually the VOC demanded expansions until Pakubuwono II was forced to yield all of the northern coast around Semarang to them in the 1740s. When the French under Napoleon took control of the Indies and appointed Herman Willem Daendels as governor, he abolished the former administrative divisions and created prefectures, including Semarang, Japara, and Pakalongan.

Semarang Residency
After the end of the French and British interregnum in the Dutch East Indies in 1817, Java was reorganized once again into Residencies. Semarang became one such Residency, although it was much smaller than its later extent, and was bordered by Pekalongan Residency to the west and Djapara Residency to the northeast.

In January 1901 the former Djapara Residency was added to Semarang Residency. A municipal council was established for the city of Semarang in 1906 followed by a regional council for Semarang Residency in 1908.

At around the time of World War I it was divided into a number of subdivisions, most of which still exist as Regencies in Indonesia today:
 Semarang, including Salatiga and Ambarawa;
 Kendal;
 Demak;
 Grobogan (with its capital at Poerwodadi);
 Pati;
 Koedoes;
 and Japara.

In the late 1920s Semarang Residency became considerably smaller because of administrative restructuring. The 1925 Decree on the Administrative Organization allowed for the subdivision of existing residencies in the Indies. However, it took time to implement and was not put in place in Central Java province until 1928. Parts of the former Semarang Residency were incorporated into the new Koedoes Residency and Blora Residency; Semarang only retained Semarang Regency, most of Kendal Regency, and Salatiga. In 1931 the borders were changed once again; Koedoes and Blora residencies were abolished, Semarang absorbed part of their territories, and the new Djepara-Rembang Residency to the northeast absorbed the rest.

After during the Japanese occupation of the Dutch East Indies and the Indonesian National Revolution, the Residencies in Java ceased to exist; after independence Indonesia added the former territory of the Semarang Residency to Central Java province, and retained the subdivisions as regencies (Semarang Regency, Demak Regency, and so on).

List of residents
 Hermannus Adriaan Parvé: 1817–1818
 Jacobus de Bruin: 1818–1820
 Willem Nicolaas Servatius: 1820–1822
 Hendrik Jacob Domis: 1822–1827
 Pieter Hubertus van Lawick van Pabst: 1827–1829
 Pieter le Clereq: 1829–1834
 Daniel François Willem Pietermaat: 1834–1834
 Hendrik Stephanus van Son: 1835–1838
 Guillaume Louis Baud: 1838–1841
 Johan Frederik Walraven van Nes: 1842–1843
 Jacob Willem Hendrik Smissaert: 1843–1846
 Arnoldus Adriaan Buijskes: 1846–1850
 Hermanus Douwe Potter: 1850–1857
 Dirk Carel August van Hogendorp: 1857–1862
 Theodore van Capellen: 1862–1864
 Adriaan Anton Maximiliaan Nicolaas Keuchenius: 1864–1867
 Karel Frederik Stijman: 1867–1868
 François Henri Adolph van de Poel: 1868–1873
 Nicolaas Dirk Lammers van Toorenburg: 1873–1875
 Gerard Marinus Willem van der Kaa: 1875–1877
 Willem Herman van der Hell: 1877–1881
 Pieter Frederik Wegener: 1881–1884
 Jan Marinus van Vleuten: 1884–1885
 Pieter Frederik Wegener: 1885–1897
 Pieter Frederik Sythoff: 1897–1905
 Henri Chrétien Antoine Gérard de Vogel: 1905–1914
 Petrus Karel Willem Kern: 1914–1920
 Jan Hendrik Nieuwenhuis: 1920–1922
 Jacob van Gigch: 1922–1924
 Adrien Henri Maas Geesteranus: 1924–1925
 Pieter Johannes van Gulik: 1925–1928
 Johannes Bijleveld: 1928–1935
 Karel Johann Alex Orie: 1935–1937
 Adolph Maximiliaan Pino: 1937–1940
 Jan Frederik Antonie van Bruggen: 1940–1942

References

Central Java
Residencies of the Dutch East Indies
Semarang
History of Central Java